Reneta Petrova Kamberova (born 12 September 1990 in Pazardzhik) is a Bulgarian Group rhythmic gymnast. She was a member of the Bulgarian winning team that won gold at the 2014 World Championships in the group all-around and a 2011 World and 2016 Olympic Group all-around bronze medalist.

Career 
A veteran of the Bulgarian Group. Kamberova has competed in 4 World Championships, Kamberova has been practising gymnastics since the age of 7. The Bulgarian group won bronze in all-around at the 2011 World Championships in Montpellier, France. She was member of the Bulgarian Group that competed at the 2012 Summer Olympics in London.

In June 2014, she and the Bulgarian group won a gold medal in the 10 clubs event of the 2014 Rhythmic Gymnastics European Championships. They won gold medal at the 2014 World Cup Final in Kazan, Russia in 3 Balls + 2 Ribbons and silver in 10 Clubs. In September 22–28, Kamberova and her group mates won gold in the group all-around at the 2014 World Championships, 17 years later since the Bulgarian group won gold at the 1996 World Championships, they also won silver medal in 3 Balls + 2 Ribbons.

On 22 December 2014, Kamberova and her colleagues from the national gymnastics team were chosen as the team of the year in Bulgarian sport.

Kamberova was a member of the Bulgarian group that competed at the 2016 Summer Olympics in Rio de Janeiro, Brazil. (Together with Lyubomira Kazanova, Mihaela Maevska, Tsvetelina Naydenova, Hristiana Todorova), they won the Group All-around bronze medal. They dedicated their medal to their teammate Tsvetelina Stoyanova, who had attempted to commit suicide and fell from her apartment in Sofia.

Detailed Olympic results

References

External links
 
 Rhythmic Gymnastics Results

1990 births
Living people
Bulgarian rhythmic gymnasts
Gymnasts at the 2012 Summer Olympics
Gymnasts at the 2016 Summer Olympics
Olympic gymnasts of Bulgaria
Sportspeople from Pazardzhik
Medalists at the Rhythmic Gymnastics European Championships
Medalists at the Rhythmic Gymnastics World Championships
Olympic bronze medalists for Bulgaria
Medalists at the 2016 Summer Olympics
European Games competitors for Bulgaria
Gymnasts at the 2015 European Games
Olympic medalists in gymnastics